The Sloppy Meateaters a.k.a. SME were a North American punk band from Rome, Georgia. The band was formed in July 1999 by founding members Josh Chambers and Kevin Highfield.

History

Origins (1999)
In October 1999, the Sloppy Meateaters recorded their debut album, Shameless Self-Promotion.  The album was first released without a record label in December 1999.  After playing to an audience of over a million viewers on the now-cancelled USA Network show Farmclub.com, the band had hit a break.

Sloppy Meateaters released Forbidden Meat in early 2001 on Orange Peal Records. The band spent the entire year touring in support of the new album, booking all of the tours themselves.  SME played one show at the Rock N Roll Hall of Fame, did a week on the Warped tour, and ended the tour in fall 2001 by crashing their van into a police car on the interstate.

By the following spring, SME  did a number of tours at this time including the Vans Warped Tour. Highfield decided to leave the band in late 2002 and Chambers felt it was better to retire the name instead of continuing on without him.

Band members
Former members
 Josh Chambers
 John Elwell
 Kevin Highfield
 Travis Gerke
 Lee Howell
 Seth Smith
 Will Tallman
 Dalton Bohanan
 Chris Frisby

Discography

Albums
 Shameless Self-Promotion (1999)
 Napkin (split) (2000)
 Forbidden Meat (2001)
 Under the Weather (2003)
 Stop Living So Ugly (2004)
 Conditioned by the Laugh Track (2005)
 Another Left Turn (2015)

References

Musical groups established in 1999
Musical groups disestablished in 2005
American musical trios
American pop punk groups
Alternative rock groups from Georgia (U.S. state)
Punk rock groups from Georgia (U.S. state)
1999 establishments in Georgia (U.S. state)